The Kockums Crane is a  high gantry crane in the Hyundai Heavy Industries shipyard in Ulsan, South Korea. It was originally used at the Kockums shipyard  in Malmö, Sweden.

History 
It was built in 1973–74 and could lift . The crane was used to build about 75 ships. Its last use in Malmö was in mid-1997, when it lifted the foundations of the high pillars of the Öresund Bridge.

The crane was first sold in the early 1990s to the Danish company Burmeister & Wain but the company went bankrupt before the crane could be moved.

The crane was a landmark of Malmö from its time of construction until its dismantling in the summer of 2002, when it was shipped to Ulsan, after being sold to Hyundai Heavy Industries for $1. The Koreans have dubbed the crane 말뫼의 눈물 (Tears of Malmö), because the residents of Malmö reportedly wept when they saw their crane being towed away.

Locations 

Former location:    ("Kockums Crane")
Today's location:  ("Tears of Malmö")

At Ulsan the crane is located on a tongue of land within the Bangeo-dong quarter right at the mouth of the Taehwa River. The two cranes share a common working area. "Tears of Malmö" is the more southern of the two.

See also

Big Blue
Breakwater Crane Railway
Finnieston Crane
Fairbairn steam crane
Left Coast Lifter
Mastekranen
Samson & Goliath
Taisun
Titan Clydebank

References

External links

 
  (in Swedish) – (Kockums Crane becomes Hyundai Crane, pictures from South Korea, km-malmo.se)
  (in Swedish) – (Malmö Shipyard History Association, pictures of the crane)
  – (report on installation of crane at Ulsan, HHI 2004)
 Video of the dismantling on YouTube 

Buildings and structures in Malmö
Buildings and structures in Ulsan
Individual cranes (machines)
Shipyard cranes
Buildings and structures completed in 1974
Goliath cranes